World federalism or global federalism is a political ideology advocating a democratic, federal world government. A world federation would have authority on issues of global reach, while the members of such a federation would retain authority over local and national issues. The overall sovereignty over the world population would largely reside in the federal government.

World federalism is distinguished from unitary world government models by the principle of subsidiarity, where decisions are made as much as possible at the most immediate level, preserving national agency to a large degree. Proponents maintain that a world federation offers a more effective and accountable global governance structure than the existing United Nations organization, while simultaneously allowing wide autonomy for national, regional and local governments.

Advocacy for world federalism has been largely organized under the World Federalist Movement.

Scope 
Unlike the more generic concept of world government, world federalism describes a specific form of global governance, i.e., that of a federal, democratic world republic. The difference between world federalism and other types of global governance are outlined below.

Distinction to the existing United Nations 
The United Nations is not a legislative body and is thus limited to a mostly advisory role. Its stated purpose is to foster cooperation between existing national governments rather than exert authority over them.

Furthermore, membership of the United Nations organization is reserved for states, not individuals (see World Citizenship).

Distinction to a unitary world government 
A unitary world government would consist of a single, central government body with supreme sovereignty. While administrative subdivisions might exist, their powers are delegated by the central government. In a world federation based on subsidiarity, the delegation is the other way round, from local to central. Global federal government is subsidiary to local in that it only does what local government cannot.

Plans that sought to unify the known world by conquest have historically aimed at a centralized, unitary government, rather than a federal government. World federalists generally do not support violent paths towards a world federation (see )

Distinction to a world confederation 
A confederation is a union of sovereign nations, which are pursuing a common cause. Member states in a confederation are sometimes free to secede from the confederation.

In a federation based on subsidiarity, nations choose to give up their sovereignty over global issues they cannot manage to a central authority empowered to manage these issues at the global level. Sovereignty over national issues remains with the nation.

Different forms of federalism can be applied at the global level. 
Traditional federalism is the model adopted by the United States, in which the States relinquish their sovereignty to the federal government, which in turn represents them in front of other nations. It constitutes a centralized model of world federalism.
The most decentralized model of world federalism is the confederation of States, or world confederalism, which gives the States a higher degree of power and freedom in which countries preserve their sovereignty, relinquishing to the federal authority only the powers to manage and regulate intergovernmental relationships.
The European Union can be considered an example of such system of government, because its Member States preserve their sovereignty even though they relinquish part of it to the community’s authorities in specific matters.

History

Origins of the idea 
World federalism has evolved from more general proposals for a world government. Proposals for a world government can be found as far back as Ancient Greece, India and China, mostly tied to a mystical cosmology. Alexander the Great pursued the goal of conquering the entire known world and subjugating it under his rule. World governments in various forms later appeared in the works of Dante Alighieri, Immanuel Kant, Anacharsis Cloots and Johann Gottlieb Fichte, where it was explicitly proposed as a means to securing world peace. A world parliament as integral part of a world republic was mentioned first by Pecqueur in 1842. The idea has been popularized by a number of prominent authors, such as Alfred Tennyson, F.A. Hayek, and H. G. Wells.

The late 19th century has also seen the establishment of a number of international institutions, such as the International Committee of the Red Cross, the Telegraphic Union, the Universal Postal Union and the Inter-Parliamentary Union with the goal of serving as "an international congress which should meet periodically to discuss international questions".

Before World War II 
The Campaign for World Government was founded in 1937 by pacifists and feminists Rosika Schwimmer and Lola Maverick Lloyd. The campaign aimed to learn from the weaknesses of the League of Nations by establishing a federal world government as an effective means to abolish war. Such a democratic world government would represent the interests of the world's people, rather than merely the national interests of member states. The pamphlet "Chaos, War or a New World Order?" (1937) outlines the campaign's approach to put the demands into practise: a World Constitutional Convention would be held to lay the groundwork for a Federation of Nations with democratic elections. The pamphlet further includes several policy suggestions, e.g., universal membership, direct representation, separation of powers, abolition of military forces, standardization of an international date system, the peaceful transfer of people out of population-dense regions, and a combined global free-trade and command economy.

Advocacy tactics involved congressional testimony, lobbying of legislators, national letter-writing campaigns, and participation in world government conferences. The campaign succeeded in motivating the resolution at the 1938 New York State Constitutional Convention encouraging President Roosevelt to call a world constitutional convention, and several Congressional resolutions and bills, including the "Alexander Peace Bill" (H.J.R. 610, 76th Cong. (1940)), and the "Tenerowicz Peace Bill" (H.J.R. 131, 77th Cong. (1941)). The organization was also one of the few independent observers of the 1944 Dumbarton Oaks conference at which the United Nations was first planned.

The Streit Council for a Union of Democracies, Inc. is the successor to Federal Union, Inc., founded in 1939 by Clarence Streit, which works to unite democracies as a path toward greater individual freedom, international solidarity, and global stability; it aims for the creation of an international order of, by and for the people.

The rise of nationalism and the growing threat of fascism in Europe caused a resurgence of the idea of a unified world under democratic principles. With the release of the book Union Now, Clarence Streit proposed a political union of democratic nations. The United States, United Kingdom, Canada, Australia, New Zealand, South Africa, Ireland, France, Belgium, the Netherlands, Switzerland, Denmark, Norway, Sweden and Finland were to form the seed for a democratic world republic. A world congress, made up of a House of Representative and a Senate should decide on matters related to defence, trade and currency.

During World War II, multiple other world federalist organizations were founded, especially in the United States. Inspired by Clarence Streit's Union Now, Harris Wofford Jr. founded the Student Federalists in 1942. The organization's success prompted Newsweek to predict he would become President of the United States.

The 1943 book One World by the Republican Wendell L. Willkie about his world tour through the Allied countries became an instant bestseller, further promoting the concept of world federalism and decolonisation to a wider audience. The publication of Emery Reves' The Anatomy of Peace in 1945, translated into thirty languages, further popularised the idea and was publicly endorsed by Albert Einstein.

After World War II 
In 1947, the Committee to Frame a World Constitution was founded, releasing "The Preliminary Draft of a World Constitution" in 1948.

Also in 1947, over 50 world federalist organizations formulated the Montreux Declaration, encapsulating the demands of the world federalist movement in light of WWII:We world federalists are convinced that the establishment of a world federal government is the crucial problem of our time. Until it is solved, all other issues, whether national or international, will remain unsettled. It is not between free enterprise and planned economy, nor between capitalism and communism that the choice lies, but between federalism and power politics. Federalism alone can assure the survival of man.The United World Federalists emerged as the main advocacy group for world federalism in the United States after WWII. The United World Federalists was a non-partisan, non-profit organization with members in forty-eight states, founded in Asheville, North Carolina on February 23, 1947 as the result of a merger of five existing world government groups: Americans United for World Government; World Federalists, U.S.A.; Student Federalists; Georgia World Citizens Committee; and the Massachusetts Committee for World Federation. The organization was renamed to World Federalists, USA (1960s), World Federalists Association (1970s) and then Citizens for Global Solutions, which is active to this day.

In 1949, six U.S. states — California, Connecticut, Florida, Maine, New Jersey, and North Carolina — applied for an Article V convention to propose an amendment “to enable the participation of the United States in a world federal government.” Multiple other state legislatures introduced or debated the same proposal. These resolutions were part of this effort.

In 1948, Garry Davis entered a meetings of the newly founded United Nations General Assembly, in which a vote on the Universal Declaration of Human Rights was expected to fail due to conflicts of national interests. He ripped his US passport, declared himself "World Citizen Number One" and asked for asylum in the United Nations, whose assembly hall had been declared international territory for the duration of the meeting. He was promptly arrested.

After his release, Davis and several supporters founded the "Operation Oran", entering a session of the United Nations General Assembly, where he gave a short speech before being escorted out of the hall:"I interrupt you in the name of the people of the world not represented here. Though my words may be unheeded, our common need for world law and order can no longer be disregarded.

We, the people, want the peace which only a world government can give. The sovereign states you represent divide us and lead us to the abyss of total war.

I call upon you no longer to deceive us by this illusion of political authority. I call upon you to convene forthwith a World Constitutional Assembly to raise the standard around which all men can gather, the standard of true peace, of One Government for One World."Prominent people, such as Albert Camus, André Breton, Albert Schweitzer and Albert Einstein publicly supported Garry Davis, fueling the sudden public interest in the idea. A first meeting of world citizens' movement in Paris a month after his speech gathered 25,000 people. Garry Davis founded the World Service Authority, promoting the idea of world citizenship. Over 750,000 people from over 150 countries around the world registered as world citizens between 1948 and 1950, and over 300 cities declared themselves as world citizen communities. Davis further founded the World Government of Citizens in his hometown of Ellsworth in 1953.

Present Day 
The movement for world federalism has declined from its peak in the 1950s, due to a lack of funding and successors for the activists who founded the original world federalist organizations.

Major active world federalist organizations include Democracy Without Borders, the Young World Federalists, Democracia Global, and Citizens for Global Solutions. The World Federalist Movement continues to act as the umbrella organization for world federalist advocacy, albeit its focus has shifted away from its original core issue towards projects like Responsibility to Protect and the Coalition for the International Criminal Court.

Proposals for establishing a world federation 

There are a number of proposals for the establishment of a world federation:

Reform of the UN and existing international institutions:

 Incremental changes of the UN, for example through the inclusion of an elected UN Parliament
League of Democratic Nations which supports a federation of nations within the UN.
 Direct reform of the UN Charter, e.g., via the mechanism outlined in Art. 109(3) ("San Francisco Promise")
Strengthening and democratization of existing global institutions, such as the WTO
Regional Unification:
Regional unification, through organizations like the African Union and the European Union.
 The Streit Council's proposal to create an open federation of Atlantic democracies. 
Other:
 Entirely new world governance institutions outside of existing institutions ("global grassroots democracy")
 Federation under the existing institutions of the constitutional order of the United States ("libertarian interstate federalism")

Numerous books and articles have been written on the practical implementation of world federalist goals.

A comprehensive analysis and a roadmap to world federalism is presented in the book World Federalist Manifesto, Guide to Political Globalization, in which the author presents a model of world federalism divided into international legislative, executive, judicial and financial branches and the world government shares the authority with Member States, in a way that both are sovereign within their respective sphere of competence.  

The Earth Constitution, drafted by international legal experts in 1968 and finalized in 1991, outlines a detailed plan for a world federalist government and is promoted today by the Earth Constitution Institute and the World Constitution and Parliament Association. Fourteen sessions of a Provisional World Parliament have been held under the auspices of this proposed system from 1982 to the present and have passed dozens of acts of model legislation on issues of global concern.

Debates 
Debate around world government falls into four broad categories, which is often applied also to world federalism:

Feasibility 
The establishment of a world federation would require extraordinary amounts of coordination and trust from all nations of the world, which are in economic and political competition with each other. Critics argue that world federalism is thus an unreachable utopia.

Proponents of world federalism point to existential crises, such as climate change, war and pandemics, which make global coordination necessary and inevitable.

An argument revolving around political realism asserts that, while conventional approaches (diplomacy, deterrence, disarmament, international organizations, etc.) have not avoided the most undesirable outcomes, world federalism instead is a realistic extension of the proven concepts of rule of law and liberal democracy to the global level.

Desirability 
Critics argue that a concentration of power on a global level would raise the risks and probability of tyranny, deterioration of human rights, and cultural homogenization.

Proponents of world federalism point out that democratic and republican principles are at the core of world federalism, which are commonly seen as safeguards against tyranny and oppression in nation states. Realizing the inherent risks of the concentration of power, world federalists advocate a vertical separation of powers between different levels of government (subsidiarity), horizontal separation of powers between different government branches (checks and balances), democratic participation, and constitutionally enshrined human and civil rights.

Sufficiency 
Critics argue that the problems world federalism proposes to solve (e.g. climate change, war, pandemics, hunger) are too big to be solved by political means only, i.e. even if a world federation existed, it would not be capable of alleviating these issues.

World federalists argue that these issues originate from the insistence on national sovereignty and the lack of democratic structures at the global level. Effective global governance could therefore deal directly with the root cause of these problems.

Necessity 
Critics argue that it is unnecessary to establish a world federation to solve global problems. They point to existing structures of global governance, such as international organizations and the United Nations.

World federalists maintain that current structures of global governance are not capable of enforcing decisions, and that they are not democratically representing the world's population.

In popular culture 
A world federation has been mentioned in several works of fiction, along with more general concepts of world government.

 Anticipations by H. G. Wells
 The Shape of Things to Come by H. G. Wells
 Men Like Gods by H. G. Wells
 Looking Backwards by Edward Bellamy
 The World Set Free by H. G. Wells
 Starship Troopers by Robert A. Heinlein

Existing world federalist organizations and campaigns

Europe

Americas

Africa

Asia and Pacific

Other organizations 
Alliance for a responsible, plural and united world
ICE Coalition
UN 2020
World Alliance to Transform the United Nations
World Government Institute
World Government Research Network

Further reading

Published works 

Archibugi, Daniele, Amazon.com, "The Global Commonwealth of Citizens. Toward Cosmopolitan Democracy", (Princeton, Princeton University Press, 2008).
 Baratta, Joseph. Barnesandnoble.com, The Politics of World Federation, (Westport, CT: Greenwood Publishing Group, 2003). Introduction available Globalsolutions.org
 Bummel, Andreas and Leinen, Jo. "A World Parliament: Governance and Democracy in the 21st Century", (Democracy Without Borders, 2018).
 Bummel, Andreas. "A Case for a UN Parliamentary Assembly and the Inter-Parliamentary Union" (Democracy Without Borders, 2019).
 Bummel, Andreas. "A Renewed World Organization for the 21st Century" (Democracy Without Borders, 2018).
 Cabrera, Luis. Political Theory of Global Justice: A Cosmopolitan Case for the World State (London: Routledge, 2004;2006).
 Daley, Tad. "Remembering Harris Wofford, Who Dreamed of a ‘United States of the World’" (Foreign Policy in Focus, 2019).
 Democracy Without Borders. "A Voice for Global Citizens: a UN World Citizens’ Initiative" (Democracy Without Borders, 2019).
 DuFord, Rochelle. "Must a world government violate the right to exist?" (Ethics & Global Politics, 2017).
 Erman, Eva. "Does Global Democracy Require a World State?" (Philosophical Papers, 2019).
 Frenk, Julio. "Governance Challenges in Global Health" (New England Journal of Medicine, 2013).
 Falk, Richard and Strauss, Andrew. " Toward Global Parliament" (Foreign Affairs, 2001).
 Gezgin, Ulaş Başar. "A thought experiment in futurology: 12 models for World Government and the World Peace" (Eurasian Journal of Anthropology, 2019).
 Glossop, Ronald J. "World Federation? A critical analysis of world government", (McFarland & Company, Inc., 1993).
 Hackett, Ian. "The Spring of Civilization" (Campaign for Earth Federation, 1973).
 Hamer, Chistopher. UNW.edu.au, Global Parliament - Principles of World Federation (Oyster Bay, NSW: Oyster Bay Books, 1998).
 Heinrich, Dieter. "The Case for a United Nations Parliamentary Assembly" (Committee for a Democratic U.N., 2010).
 Jacobs, Didier. "Global Democracy: The Struggle for Political and Civil Rights in the 21st Century" (Vanderbilt University Press, 2007).
 Kant, Immanuel. "To Perpetual Peace: A Philosophical Sketch", (Hackett Publishing Company, Inc., 2003).
 Kelsen, Hans. "Peace Through Law" (The Lawbook Exchange, 2000).
 Lothian, Philip Henry Kerr. "Pacifism is Not Enough, Nor Patriotism Either", (Clarendon Press, 1935).
 Lykov Andrey Yurievich. World state as the future of the international community (Moscow: Prospekt, 2013).
 Ma'ani Ewing, Sovaida. "Building a World Federation: The Key to Resolving Our Global Crises" (Center for Peace and Global Governance, 2005).
 Maritain, Jacques. "Man and the State" (The Catholic University of America Press, 1998).
 Martin, Glen T. "One World Renaissance: Holistic Planetary Transformation Through a Global Social Contract" (The Institute for Economic Democracy, 2015).
 Mazower, Mark. "Governing the World: The History of an Idea, 1815 to the Present", (Penguin Books, 2013).
 McClintock, John. The Uniting of Nations: An Essay on Global Governance (3rd ed. revised and updated, P.I.E. Peter Lang, 2010)
 Marchetti, Raffaele. Global Democracy: For and Against. Ethical Theory, Institutional Design and Social Struggles (London: Routledge, 2008) Amazon.com, . 
 Mayer, Joseph. "Geneva-1950: A Peoples’ World Constituent Assembly" (Bulletin of the Atomic Scientists, 1959).
 Monbiot, George. "The Age of Consent" (Harper Perennial, 2004).
 Niebuhr, Reinhold. "The Illusion of World Government" (Bulletin of the Atomic Scientists, 1949).
 Privat, Edmond. "Federala Sperto", (Universala Ligo, 1958).
 Reves, Emery. "The Anatomy of Peace" (Harper and Brothers, 1945).
 Russell, Bertrand. "Only World Government Can Prevent the War Nobody Can Win" (Bulletin of the Atomic Scientists, 1958).
 Stark, Jim. Rescue Plan for Planet Earth: Democratic World Government through a Global Referendum (Toronto: Key Publishing House Inc., 2008)
 Strauss, Andrew. Oneworldtrust.org, Taking Democracy Global: Assessing the Benefits and Challenges of a Global Parliamentary Assembly. (London: One World Trust, 2005).
 Streit, Clarence. "Union Now" (Jonathan Cape, 1939).
 Talbott, Strobe. "The Great Experiment: The Story of Ancient Empires, Modern States, and the Quest for a Global Nation" (Simon & Schuster, 2008).
 Tenbergen, Rasmus. "United Humans" (Democracy Without Borders, 2018).
 Tetalman, Jerry. "One World Democracy: A Progressive Vision for Enforceable Global Law" (Origin Press, 2005).
 Usborne, Henry. "The Crusade for World Government" (Bulletin of the Atomic Scientists, 1947).
 Wells, Henry George. "The Outline of History", (George Newnes, 1920).
 Willkie, Wendell. "One World" (Simon and Schuster, 1943).
 Wendt, Alexander. "Why a World State is Inevitable," European Journal of International Relations, Vol. 9, No. 4 (2003), pp. 491–542
 Yunker, James A. Political Globalization: A New Vision of Federal World Government (Lanham, MD: University Press of America, 2007)
 Yunker, James A. "The Idea of World Government: From ancient times to the twenty-first century" (Routledge, 2001).

See also 
 Albert Einstein
 Immanuel Kant
 Cosmopolitan Democracy
 Cosmopolitanism
 Federalism
 Global Governance
 Humanism
 International Criminal Court
 International Relations
 Panhumanism
 New world order (Baháʼí)
 Regionalisation
 United Nations
 United Nations Parliamentary Assembly
 World Federalist Movement
 World Government

References

External links 

 FAQ on world federalism - Young World Federalists
 Full text of the Montreux Declaration in multiple languages - Young World Federalists

World government
Global politics
Governance
Politics